Give Love on Christmas is a Philippine daytime Christmas drama anthology series produced by Dreamscape Entertainment Television. The series premiered on ABS-CBN's PrimeTanghali noontime block, replacing the 2-year run of Be Careful with My Heart and was replaced by Oh My G!. The show was aired only for the Christmas season from December 1, 2014, to January 16, 2015.

Cast 
The Gift Giver

Air date: December 1, 2014 - December 19, 2014
Cast 
 Eddie Garcia as Ernest Aguinaldo - Laura's husband, Makoy, Eric, Rose, Julie, Mariz, Anton and Louie's father
 Aiko Melendez as Rose Aguinaldo - Ernest and Laura's eldest daughter and Makoy's eldest sister
 Dimples Romana as Julie Aguinaldo-Salcedo - Louie's wife, Ernest and Laura's daughter and Makoy's sister
 Carlo Aquino as Eric Aguinaldo - Ernest and Laura's eldest son and Makoy's eldest brother
 Louise Abuel as Makoy Aguinaldo - Ernest and Laura's youngest son, Eric, Rose, Mariz, Anton and Louie's youngest brother
 Nadine Samonte as Mariz Lopez-Aguinaldo 
 Marco Alcaraz as Anton
 Gerald Madrid as Louie Salcedo - Julie's husband
 Alicia Alonzo as Laura Aguinaldo† - Ernest's wife and Makoy, Eric, Rose, Julie, Mariz, Anton and Louie's mother

Gift of Life

Air date: December 22, 2014 - January 2, 2015
 Melissa Mendez as Faye Ramos
 Jeffrey Santos as Robert Ramos
 Gerald Anderson as Tristan Ramos
 Maja Salvador as Melissa Francisco
 Daria Ramirez as Nenita Francisco
 Levi Ignacio as Julian Francisco
 Marlann Flores 
 Nico Antonio
 Shey Bustamante
 Angel Sy as Anna Francisco

Exchange Gift

Air date: January 5, 2015 - January 16, 2015
 Paulo Avelino as Christian Cabrera
 KC Concepcion as Anna Reyes-Cabrera
 Miguel Vergara as Josh / Jacob R. Cabrera
 Melai Cantiveros-Francisco as Ruby
 Jason Francisco as Alvin
 Cheska Iñigo
 Jim Paredes as Mr. Reyes
 Ron Morales as Anthony

See also
List of programs broadcast by ABS-CBN
 List of Christmas films

References

ABS-CBN drama series
Philippine anthology television series
Christmas television series
2014 Philippine television series debuts
2015 Philippine television series endings
Television series by Dreamscape Entertainment Television
Filipino-language television shows